"Alone on Christmas Eve"  is a song by Swedish singer Måns Zelmerlöw. The song was released as a digital download on 6 November 2020 through Warner Music Sweden. The song was written by Måns Zelmerlöw, Robert Jallinder, Theo Kylin and Tobias Stenkjaer. The song peaked at number ninety-two on the Swedish Singles Chart.

Critical reception
Renske ten Veen of Wiwibloggs wrote, "With 'Alone On Christmas Eve', Måns Zelmerlöw gives us a contemporary holiday pop song. It's a powerful and daring spin on the genre, but it succeeds. As the Eurovision 2015 champion called it on Instagram, 'Alone On Christmas Eve' is a lovely little Christmas song that you definitely want to add to your playlists."

Music video
A music video to accompany the release of "Alone on Christmas Eve" was first released onto YouTube on 29 November 2020.

Personnel
Credits adapted from Tidal.
 Fredrik Sonefors – producer
 Måns Zelmerlöw – writer
 Robert Jallinder – writer
 Theo Kylin – writer
 Tobias Stenkjaer – writer

Charts

References

2020 songs
2020 singles
Måns Zelmerlöw songs